Halszka Wasilewska can refer to:

 Halszka Wasilewska (soldier)
 Halszka Wasilewska (journalist)